Ramblin' Man or Rambling Man may refer to:

TV
Ramblin' Man, reissue title of TV movie Concrete Cowboys

Music
The Ramblin' Man, a 1974 album by Waylon Jennings
Ramblin' Man, a 1992 compilation by The Allman Brothers Band
Ramblin' Man, a 2014 album by Hank Williams III
Ramblin' Man (Campbell and Lanegan album), a 2005 EP by Isobel Campbell and Mark Lanegan

Songs
"Ramblin' Man" (Hank Williams song), a 1951 song later covered by grandson Hank Williams III and The Melvins in 1999
"Ramblin' Man" (The Allman Brothers Band song), 1973
"Ramblin' Man", a song from Lemon Jelly's 2002 album Lost Horizons
"Rambling Man", a song by Laura Marling from album I Speak Because I Can
"Ramblin' Man/Theme from Ramblin' Man" , a song from Steve Martin album, Let's Get Small
"I'm a Ramblin' Man", a 1967 song by Ray Pennington also covered by Waylon Jennings